AC Ajaccio are a French football club which are based in Ajaccio. They play their home games at the Stade François Coty. During the 2014/15 campaign, they will be competing in the Ligue 2, Coupe de France, and Coupe de la Ligue.

Competitions

Ligue 2

League table

Results summary

Results by round

Matches

Coupe de France

Coupe de la Ligue

References

External links 
 
Soccerway Profile

AC Ajaccio seasons
Ajaccio